Malin Atanasov (born 14 June 1946) is a former Bulgarian ice hockey player. He played for the Bulgaria men's national ice hockey team at the 1976 Winter Olympics in Innsbruck.

His younger brother, Ivan Atanasov, also played for the Bulgarian national ice hockey team at the 1976 Winter Olympics.

References

External links
 

1946 births
Living people
Bulgarian ice hockey forwards
Ice hockey players at the 1976 Winter Olympics
Olympic ice hockey players of Bulgaria